The 57th Assembly District of the Wisconsin is one of 99 districts in the Wisconsin State Assembly.  Located in east-central Wisconsin, the district comprises the northeast corner of Winnebago County and part of southern Outagamie County.  The district contains most of the city of Appleton, including the downtown area, and most of the city of Menasha.  It also contains Appleton landmarks such as the Lawrence University campus, the Fox Cities Performing Arts Center, the University of Wisconsin–Oshkosh, Fox Cities Campus, the historic Appleton Locks on the Lower Fox River, and the Fox River Paper Company Historic District. The district is represented by Democrat Lee Snodgrass, since January 2021.

The 57th Assembly District is located within Wisconsin's 19th Senate district, along with the 55th and 56th Assembly districts.

List of past representatives

References 

Wisconsin State Assembly districts
Outagamie County, Wisconsin
Winnebago County, Wisconsin